Amanda Chase (née Freeman; born December 1, 1969) is an American conservative politician. Since 2016, she has been a member of the Virginia Senate for the 11th District, representing Amelia County, the city of Colonial Heights, and part of Chesterfield County. In 2020, Chase ran an unsuccessful campaign for the Republican nomination for governor of Virginia in 2021.

Chase attended Donald Trump's rally preceding the 2021 storming of the United States Capitol, where she appeared to voice support for rioters by calling them "patriots" and suggesting that Trump might still be sworn in as president, despite losing the election to Joe Biden. She also stated, "The insurrection is actually the deep state with the politicians working against the people to overthrow our government."

The Virginia State Senate censured Chase on a 24–9 vote (with three Republicans joining the majority) for "conduct unbecoming a senator" and "fomenting insurrection against the United States," stripping Chase of her lone committee assignment. This was the first censure of a Virginia state senator since 1987. Despite saying she would "wear the censure as a badge of honor," Chase filed a federal lawsuit against the Virginia State Senate, which was subsequently dismissed.

Early life and career
Chase was born in Sheffield, Alabama, on December 1, 1969. She has been a resident of Chesterfield County since 1979 and graduated from Monacan High School in 1988. In 1992, she received a Bachelor of Science degree in business from Virginia Tech. Chase has worked in banking and financial management. Since 2010, she has operated Chase Consulting LLC, a campaign management firm. Since 2013, Chase has been an independent contractor in the financial services industry.

Political career

Political staffer
In 2009, Chase worked for Republican Ken Cuccinelli during his successful campaign for Virginia Attorney General; later, she was a staffer to Republican congressman Dave Brat.

Elections to the Virginia State Senate
In 2015, Chase won the Republican nomination in Virginia's 11th State Senate District in an upset primary victory against incumbent Senator Stephen H. Martin, who had served since 1994. The solidly Republican district comprises Amelia County, Colonial Heights, and much of Chesterfield. Chase went on to defeat the Democratic nominee, attorney and retired Army colonel E. Wayne Powell, in the general election by about 69% to 31%. Chase won reelection in 2019, defeating Democratic nominee Amanda Pohl.

Persona, positions, and controversies
During her political career, Chase has adopted a Donald Trump-like impact and persona. One of the most far-right members of the state Senate, she has described herself as "Trump in heels" and gained attention in Virginia politics with provocative comments and stunts. She has repeatedly promoted baseless claims that the 2020 U.S. presidential election was marred by election fraud and "stolen" by Democrats; she has also claimed that Virginia Democrats "hate white people". Chase marched with the far-right "boogaloo boys" in Richmond carrying an AR-15.

Removal from the Chesterfield County Republican Party
In 2019, Chase was removed from the Chesterfield County Republican Party Committee after clashing with others in the organization; Chase had promoted the campaign of an independent candidate for sheriff, violating a party rule barring Republican committee members from supporting a non-Republican candidate running against a Republican nominee. The move was mostly symbolic, depriving her of voting rights in the county party, but having no effect on her status as a Republican nominee.

Failure to Caucus with the Republicans in the Virginia State Senate
In November 2019, Chase announced that she would not caucus with the Republicans in the State Senate in 2020, citing what she called broken and failed Republican leadership, and lack of transparency. Chase remains affiliated with the Republican Party.

Wearing a firearm in session
On January 15, 2019, Chase openly carried a loaded .38-caliber handgun in a holster while presenting bills to a state Senate committee, saying she did so as "a deterrent for over-exuberant folks.

Cursing at Capitol Police officer over a parking spot
On March 22, 2019, Chase reportedly became "irate" and used supposed profanities at Capitol Police officers after being told that she was not allowed to park in the secured Pedestrian Plaza on Bank Street where she would park at times during session. When asked to move her car she told the officer that she would not move her vehicle "unless you let the f---ing barricades down to let me in". She was eventually allowed to park.

Other provocative and controversial statements
In a July 2019 post on Facebook about the Second Amendment, Chase said "[i]t's those who are naive and unprepared that end up raped. Sorry. But I'm not going to be a statistic." After a backlash, Chase posted a video in which she declined to apologize; said that her reply was "taken out of context"; and attacked critics as "trolls".

After Virginia Governor Ralph Northam (D) proclaimed October 12, 2020, to be Indigenous People's Day, Chase promised in a fundraising e-mail to abolish Indigenous People's Day when she became Governor, claiming the true goal of the holiday was to destroy the United States and give all the land back to Native Americans.

In April 2021, a jury convicted former Minneapolis police officer Derek Chauvin of the murder of George Floyd (see Trial of Derek Chauvin). Chase said in a video that the conviction made her "sick" and claimed that the verdict was motivated by politics.

Confederate monuments
Chase opposes removing the Robert E. Lee Monument in Richmond, Virginia, which has become a flashpoint of protests in recent times. "Removing the Robert E. Lee statue is a cowardly capitulation to the looters and domestic terrorists." Chase further stated that the removal of Confederate statues is an "overt effort to erase all white history".

COVID-19 pandemic
During the COVID-19 pandemic, Chase refused to wear a face mask during Virginia Senate sessions, contrary to public health guidance at the time. As a result of her refusal to wear a mask, she was required to sit in a plexiglass box during Senate sessions.

Affiliation with arrested gunman Antonio Lamotta
Chase has repeatedly posed for photographs with Antonio Lamotta, a QAnon promoter who was arrested in Philadelphia shortly after the 2020 election for carrying pistols, an AR-15 rifle, and over 150 rounds of ammunition without a valid Pennsylvania firearms permit, a third-degree felony. Chase asserted that the story was "fake news" from the "fake media" and that there is "no connection" between her and Lamotta other than his being a "supporter" of hers.

Support for overturning 2020 presidential election results

Support for declaration of martial law
In a Facebook post on December 15, 2020, after Joe Biden defeated Donald Trump in the 2020 presidential election, Chase called upon Trump to declare federal martial law and overturn the election results. Chase baselessly asserted that there was "extensive fraud here in Virginia" and alleged that the Biden–Harris campaign "cheated to win". Democratic representative Jennifer Wexton called Chase "unhinged" and Republican gubernatorial candidate Kirk Cox called her position "absurd and dangerous"; other officials also condemned Chase's statement, including Denver Riggleman, Barbara Comstock, and David Ramadan.

Storming of the United States Capitol and censure by the state Senate
Chase attended Donald Trump's rally prior to the 2021 attack on the U.S. Capitol, but stated that she left before the rioting began. Chase refused to denounce the attack on the Capitol. She praised the rioters as "Patriots who love their country and do not want to see our great republic turn into a socialist country" while falsely suggesting that left-wing "antifa or BLM agents of destruction" were to blame for the assault. (After Chase promoted this falsehood on Facebook, the social media site suspended her official Facebook account, which has more than 100,000 followers, for one week; her personal Facebook account was unaffected.)

Chase also expressed her disappointment that Vice President Mike Pence did not intercede in the counting of the electoral votes to overturn Biden's victory. Chase later said that Trump still might be sworn in for a second term, saying, "The insurrection is actually the deep state with the politicians working against the people to overthrow our government."

On January 27, 2021, the state Senate voted 24–9 to censure Chase for "conduct unbecoming a senator" and "fomenting insurrection against the United States." Three Republicans joining the majority in passing the censure resolution, which marked the first censure of a Virginia state senator since 1987. Six Republican senators did not vote. Republican leaders in the Virginia Senate removed her from her committee assignment and bemoaned her "selfishness and constant need for media attention." In February 2021, Chase sued the state Senate and its clerk, claiming that the censure violated her First Amendment rights; the court dismissed her suit in May 2021.

Chase also claimed that Democratic state Senator Jennifer McClellan, a candidate for governor, could not represent all Virginians because of her leadership role in the Virginia Legislature's Black Caucus; this was one of several statements cited in the censure resolution against Chase.

Campaign for the 2021 Republican gubernatorial nomination

Chase announced on February 17, 2020, that she would be seeking the Republican gubernatorial nomination in the 2021 election. In December 2020, after the Virginia Republican Party decided to select its statewide nominees through a convention rather than an open primary, Chase said she would run for governor in the 2021 election as an independent candidate in the general election, but would remain a Republican. Chase threatened to seek the gubernatorial nomination as an independent in an "independent primary." Six days later, Chase reversed her decision to run as an independent, and continued on to run as a Republican while pushing for a primary. On January 23, 2021, the 80-member Republican State Central Committee debated a proposal by Chase and her supporters to scrap the convention in favor of a primary. Amid an acrimonious debate, deadlock, and parliamentary maneuvering, the committee voted to stay with a convention. In an interview with The New York Times, Chase vowed to "take out whichever Democratic candidate wins the nomination, and I will be the next governor of Virginia."

On February 9, 2021, Chase sued the Republican Party of Virginia, arguing that the convention is illegal under current executive orders. A Virginia circuit court judge dismissed the suit ten days later.

Chase was one of seven candidates seeking the Republican nomination for governor: the others were Delegate Kirk Cox, a longtime member of the House of Delegates; Sergio de la Peña, a retired Army colonel and former Trump Defense Department appointee; Peter Doran, a former think tank executive; Pete Snyder, a businessman; Octavia Johnson, a former Roanoke sheriff; and Glenn Youngkin, a former co-chief executive of the Carlyle Group. All of the Republican candidates for the gubernatorial nomination campaigned on the basis of their loyalty to Trump. On May 10, 2021, Chase lost her bid for nomination at the Republican nomination convention to Youngkin. She came in third place in a seven-candidate field; she was eliminated in the second-to-last round of ranked-choice voting, with 25%. The top two candidates, Youngkin and Snyder, are both multimillonaires and vastly outspent Chase, whose campaign expenditures were around $600,000. Winner Youngkin went on to defeat Democrat Terry McAuliffe in the general election.

2022 congressional race
In November 2021, Chase announced she would run for the Republican nomination to potentially take on Democratic Congresswoman Abigail Spanberger in Virginia's 7th Congressional District. In January 2022, after congressional redistricting put her home in Virginia's 1st Congressional District, Chase announced she would not run against incumbent Republican Congressman Rob Wittman.

Election results

 

 -->

 -->

References

External links

1969 births
Protesters in or near the January 6 United States Capitol attack
21st-century American women politicians
21st-century American politicians
American conspiracy theorists
Candidates in the 2021 United States elections
Living people
People from Sheffield, Alabama
Far-right politicians in the United States
Republican Party Virginia state senators
Virginia Tech alumni
Women state legislators in Virginia
Right-wing politics in the United States